Friends: The Reunion is a 2021 reunion special of the American television sitcom Friends. The special is hosted by James Corden and executive produced by the show's co-creators, Marta Kauffman and David Crane, Kevin S. Bright, the show's main cast, and Ben Winston (who also directed the special). The special sees the main cast revisit the sets of the original show (such as the Friends' apartments, the Central Perk coffee shop, and the signature water fountain), meet with guests who appeared on the show as well as celebrity guests, do table reads and re-enactments of Friends episodes, and share behind-the-scenes footage.

Production

Development 
In November 2019, Warner Bros. Television was developing a Friends reunion special for their new streaming service, HBO Max. The special would feature the whole cast and co-stars. In February 2020, an unscripted Friends was commissioned with all original cast and co-creators returning.

The special was executive produced by the show's co-creators, Kevin S. Bright, Marta Kauffman and David Crane, and the show's main cast, Jennifer Aniston, Courteney Cox, Lisa Kudrow, Matt LeBlanc, Matthew Perry and David Schwimmer. Ben Winston directed and executive produced through Fulwell 73. Warner Bros. Unscripted & Alternative Television (later Warner Horizon Unscripted Television) was also involved in the production of the special.

Filming
The special was filmed in Los Angeles, California, at Stage 24, also known as "The Friends Stage" at Warner Bros. Studios, Burbank, where Friends had been filmed since its second season. The filming of the reunion began in April 2021. Filming of the special was delayed twice, first in March 2020, and second in August 2020, both due to the COVID-19 pandemic.

The trivia game and talk show segments of the special, hosted by James Corden, were filmed in front of a live audience of "mostly union extras, [who were] COVID screened and hired for the gig". Representatives for Perry clarified that he had an emergency dental surgery prior to filming when viewers were concerned about his appearance.

In an episode of Rob Lowe's podcast released in January 2021, Kudrow said she had only seen the rebuilt Central Perk set and filmed "a little something" which eventually became Lady Gaga's appearance recorded in November 2020. Director and producer Ben Winston stated the cast trivia game segment was being planned out in March 2021 while producing The Late Late Show and the 63rd Annual Grammy Awards.

Cast

Main cast
 Jennifer Aniston
 Courteney Cox
 Lisa Kudrow
 Matt LeBlanc 
 Matthew Perry
 David Schwimmer

Original show producers
 Kevin S. Bright
 David Crane
 Marta Kauffman

Host
 James Corden

Guest stars

 David Beckham
 Justin Bieber (wearing Ross's Spud-nik costume)
 BTS
 Cindy Crawford (wearing Ross's leather pants and buttoned shirt)
 Cara Delevingne (wearing Rachel's maid of honor dress and Ross's Holiday Armadillo costume)
 Soleil Moon Frye (audience guest)
 Elliott Gould (audience guest, who played Jack Geller)
 Kit Harington
 Lady Gaga (performing "Smelly Cat" with Kudrow, dressed as Phoebe, and referencing her role in A Star Is Born)
 Larry Hankin (trivia game guest, who played Mr. Heckles)
 Mindy Kaling
 Thomas Lennon (trivia game guest, who played Joey's identical hand twin)
 Christina Pickles (audience guest, who played Judy Geller)
 Tom Selleck (trivia game guest, who played Richard Burke)
 James Michael Tyler (cast interview guest on Zoom, who played Gunther)
 Maggie Wheeler (cast interview guest, who played Janice Litman-Goralnik)
 Reese Witherspoon (who played Jill Green)

The three actors who portrayed the barbershop quartet in "The One With All the Jealousy" appeared in the trivia game segment. Show guest stars Danny DeVito, Ben Stiller, Julia Roberts, Brad Pitt and Sean Penn were mentioned and shown via archive footage. Actor Paul Rudd briefly appeared in the series finale curtain call. Appearances by director James Burrows and comedian Bob Newhart were cut from the special and used as bonus clips in the HBO Max release.

Release
The reunion special was originally set to be released with the launch of HBO Max on May 27, 2020, along with the 236 episodes of the original series that were available at launch; this was delayed a year later due to the COVID-19 pandemic. In May 2021, a teaser trailer was released announcing that the reunion special was scheduled to be released on May 27, 2021, on HBO Max. The HBO Max release includes five bonus clips that were cut from the special as extras.

The special was also released internationally simultaneously with the U.S. release on Crave in Canada, Sky One and NOW in the United Kingdom, Ireland and Italy, Foxtel Now and Binge in Australia, TVNZ 2 and TVNZ OnDemand in New Zealand, ZEE5 in India, OSN in the United Arab Emirates, HBO Go and HBO Asia in Singapore, Malaysia, Indonesia, Vietnam, Thailand, the Philippines, Taiwan and Hong Kong, HBO Nordic in Sweden, Denmark, Norway and Finland, HBO España in Spain and HBO Portugal in Portugal.

In China, the special was streamed on iQIYI, Youku and Tencent Video, although the scenes featuring Lady Gaga, Justin Bieber, and BTS have been removed. LGBTQ references and references to urine in the special were also removed. In Japan, the special was exclusively released on U-NEXT on May 31, 2021.

In Vietnam, the special was streamed on FPT Play and VieOn with Vietnamese subtitles being hardsubbed. In South Africa, the special was aired on MNET(DStv) on May 30, 2021, and was released for streaming on Showmax on May 31, 2021.

Reception

Critical response
On Rotten Tomatoes, the special has an approval rating of 67% based on 52 reviews, with an average score of 6.4/10. The website's critics consensus is, "It may work best for die-hards, but when it cuts out the noise and focuses on the connections Friends: The Reunion is as warm and comforting as a night in the café." On Metacritic, the special has a weighted average score of 65 out of 100 indicating "generally favorable reviews" based on 27 critics.

Ratings and viewership
According to a TV analytics provider TVision, Friends: The Reunion was watched by an estimated 29% of U.S. streaming households on May 27. It also revealed that a significant part of its audience were people between the ages of 35 and 54 (50%) and female (55.4%). According to the analytics company Antenna, the special also drove more subscription to HBO Max in its opening weekend in the U.S. than any of Warner Bros.' new movies in 2021. In the United Kingdom, Friends: The Reunion aired on Sky One and became the channel's most watched programme in its history, with 5.3 million viewers tuning in.

Accolades

See also
 2021 in American television

References

External links

2021 television specials
2020s American television specials
2021 in American television
Television series reunion specials
Friends (1994 TV series) episodes
HBO Max original programming
Television censorship in China
Television productions postponed due to the COVID-19 pandemic